Al McAffrey (born June 6, 1948) is an American politician from Oklahoma who served in the Oklahoma Senate, representing District 46. He has served in the Oklahoma House of Representatives, representing District 88. McAffrey unsuccessfully ran for the United States House of Representatives in 2014.

Early life, education and career
The son of a Baptist minister, McAffrey was raised in Sulphur, Oklahoma, graduating from Sulphur High School in 1966. After graduating from Oklahoma State University in 1974, McAffrey enlisted in the U.S. Navy and served as a Navy Corpsman. Upon returning to Oklahoma, McAffrey joined the Oklahoma City Police Department and later went on to own and operate several successful small businesses. He owns and operates OK Cremation & Mortuary Services.

Political career
 After winning the Democratic party's three-way primary on July 25, 2006, McAffrey faced no Republican opposition and was sworn into the Oklahoma House of Representatives on the State's Centennial birthday on November 16, 2006.

McAffrey was unopposed in 2008 and re-elected to a third term in 2010, winning the general election after defeating Republican challenger Dominique DaMon Block, Sr. with 69.6% of the vote.

During his last term in the Oklahoma House of Representatives, McAffrey served on the Public Health, Administrative Rules and Government Oversight, Public Safety and Economic Development, Tourism & Financial Services committees. He also served as assistant minority floor leader.

On October 18, 2011, Sen. Andrew Rice (D–Oklahoma City) announced that he would resign from the Oklahoma Senate effective January 2012. McAffrey  announced his candidacy for Rice's seat and won the special election on February 14, 2012. McAfrey defeated Republican Jason Reese, taking nearly 70% of the vote, and was sworn into office on February 22, 2012.

McAffrey was the Democratic nominee for the United States House of Representatives in 2014 in Oklahoma's 5th congressional district. He unsuccessfully ran again in 2016.

Community service
McAffrey is a strong supporter of AIDS awareness. He is a board member of the Regional AIDS Intercommunity Network-Oklahoma (RAIN) and is serving on the Advisory Council for the AIDS Walk in Oklahoma City. He is also an active member of the Diversity Business Association.

Personal
An openly gay man, McAffrey was the first openly LGBT person elected to serve in the Oklahoma Legislature. A father of three daughters and grandfather of eight grandchildren, McAffrey lives in Oklahoma City. He is a member of St. Paul's Episcopal Cathedral in Oklahoma City and is active in the Mesta Park Neighborhood Association. McAffrey also serves as a voting member of the Choctaw Nation. He resides in downtown Oklahoma City.

Electoral history

References

External links

 
 House of Representatives biography

1948 births
21st-century American politicians
21st-century Native American politicians
American LGBT military personnel
Candidates in the 2014 United States elections
Candidates in the 2016 United States elections
American funeral directors
Gay politicians
LGBT state legislators in Oklahoma
Living people
Democratic Party members of the Oklahoma House of Representatives
Choctaw Nation of Oklahoma state legislators in Oklahoma
Democratic Party Oklahoma state senators
People from Konawa, Oklahoma
People from Sulphur, Oklahoma
Politicians from Oklahoma City
United States Navy corpsmen
Gay military personnel
20th-century Native Americans
21st-century LGBT people